Veckatimest is the third studio album by American rock band Grizzly Bear, released on May 26, 2009, by Warp Records. The album is named after Veckatimest Island, a small island in Dukes County, Massachusetts. Produced by bassist and multi-instrumentalist Chris Taylor, the album entered the US Billboard 200 at #8, selling 33,000 copies in its first week of release. By September 2012, the album had sold around 220,000 copies in the US. In 2010. It was awarded a gold certification from the Independent Music Companies Association which indicated sales of at least 100,000 copies throughout Europe.

The album was also included in the 2011 edition of the book 1001 Albums You Must Hear Before You Die.

Background and recording
The recording of Veckatimest began in summer 2008 at Allaire Studios in the Catskill Mountains of upstate New York. Regarding the writing process, Ed Droste states: 

Nico Muhly collaborated with Grizzly Bear on this album. In the interim, they debuted four new songs: "Two Weeks", "While You Wait for the Others", "Fine for Now" and "Cheerleader". They also performed "While You Wait for the Others" on Late Night with Conan O'Brien on April 21, 2008, and performed "Two Weeks" on Late Show with David Letterman on July 23, 2008. The band performed the track "Two Weeks" Live in the UK on Later... with Jools Holland on 5 May 2009

A deluxe edition of the album was released on November 2, 2009, in Europe. Along with the twelve original tracks, it contained an exclusive 24 page booklet and a bonus disc of Veckatimest tracks recorded in various locations. Although the release was exclusive to Europe, the bonus tracks were released digitally to the US in the iTunes Store.

Releases
An unmastered version of the album was leaked before its release. Regarding this, Ed Droste states:

Packaging

Artwork
The abstract drawing was created by William O'Brien and chosen by Droste, whom he has known since high school. Although the piece was not originally intended to be used as Veckatimest'''s artwork, O'Brien had been working on it at the same time as Grizzly Bear was working on the record. After contacting O'Brien requesting to use one of his pieces for the new album, Droste received a number of examples to choose from. Initially O'Brien was surprised Droste had chosen that specific piece for the artwork as he felt it had an "awkward placement" to it, but after hearing the album he reconsidered the piece, "it was like this amazing, beautiful thing that happened".
Along with Veckatimest, O'Brien also created the artwork for the accompanying singles, and the European bonus disc. Although unclarified, it is most likely that the other artwork for the singles and bonus disc was taken from the same abstract series that spawned the Veckatimest piece as they all have a similar nature.

Title
The album's title is a reference to Veckatimest Island, a small island in Dukes County, Massachusetts and a member of the Elizabeth Islands, a chain of small islands extending southwest from the southern coast of Cape Cod, Massachusetts. Naushon Island, another member of the Elizabeth Islands, is owned by the Forbes family and Grizzly Bear's founding member, Ed Droste, is connected to the Forbes family through his mother Diana Forbes. In an interview with Pitchfork, Droste explained the title: 

Reception and legacy

On release, Veckatimest was greeted with widespread critical acclaim, currently holding a score of 85 at the aggregate critic review site, Metacritic. The album is generally viewed by critics as a large step forward for Grizzly Bear in regards to partial genre-blending, musical complexity and experimentation.

Both "While You Wait for the Others" and "Two Weeks" appeared in Pitchforks Top 500 Tracks of the 2000s, ranking at #334 and #162 respectively. The album was ranked #42 on their list of the decade's top 200 albums. Rhapsody called it the 8th best album of 2009. Official music videos have been produced for "Two Weeks", "While You Wait for the Others" and "Ready, Able". Veckatimest was also voted Stereogum's second best album of 2009.Veckatimest was well-placed on many "End of the Year" lists, with Rolling Stone placing it at 21st, Spin magazine placing it at 4th and Pitchfork at 6th.

Jack Goes Boating and Blue Valentine
Many of the album's tracks appear in actor Philip Seymour Hoffman's directorial debut, Jack Goes Boating (2010), acting as the film's primary score. Hoffman noted, "Susan Jacobs the music supervisor threw Grizzly Bear my way. She was like, "You should really listen to them!" I heard their album and I was like, "Definitely!" There was a bunch of music from Grizzly Bear that I used, which fit so nicely."

Instrumental tracks from the album also appear on the film, Blue Valentine (2010), with Grizzly Bear subsequently releasing a soundtrack album to the film, in 2011.

Track listing

Personnel
The following people contributed to Veckatimest'':

Band
Daniel Rossen – vocals, guitar, keyboards, string arrangements ("I Live With You")
Ed Droste – vocals, guitar, keyboards, omnichord
Chris Taylor – bass guitar, woodwinds, backing vocals
Christopher Bear – drums, backing vocals

Additional musicians
Victoria Legrand - backing vocals ("Two Weeks")
Brooklyn Youth Choir - backing vocals ("Cheerleader", "I Live With You", "Foreground")
Acme String Quartet - strings ("Southern Point", "Ready, Able", "I Live With You", "Foreground")
Nico Muhly - choral arrangements ("Cheerleader", "Foreground"), string quartet arrangements ("Southern Point", "Ready, Able", "Foreground")

Recording personnel
Chris Taylor - producer, engineer
Gareth Jones - co-mixing engineer
Greg Calbi - mastering
Steve Falone - mastering assistant

Artwork
 William J. O'Brien - drawings
 Ben Wilkerson Tousley - design
 Amelia Bauer - hand drawn text

Charts

References

External links
An interview with the band discussing the album track-by-track 
Ed Droste on mixing Veckatimest 

Grizzly Bear (band) albums
2009 albums
Albums produced by Chris Taylor (Grizzly Bear musician)
Warp (record label) albums
Chamber pop albums